Don Haig (22 July 1933 — 2 March 2002) was a Canadian filmmaker, editor, and producer.

His work in film and television spanned nearly five decades. Over the course of his career, he won Academy, Genie, and Gemini awards, and the Governor General's Performing Arts Award.

Don was known as the "godfather of Canadian film" for nurturing young talent and producing many award-winning films. He is recognized by some as "the most important person on the Canadian film scene," helping create over 500 films.

Career
Haig left high school after grade 9 and took a job repairing films at the Winnipeg distribution offices of MGM. In 1956, he moved to Toronto and was hired by the CBC film department, splicing commercials into The Ed Sullivan Show. After moving through the ranks and establishing a reputation as a superb editor, he left the CBC in 1962 and travelled to Europe, where he met Canadian producer/director Allan King. Back in Toronto, they joined with producer/director Beryl Fox to form their own company, Film Arts (aka Haig-King Film Arts). The CBC contracted Film Arts to edit and/or co-produce segments for This Hour Has Seven Days and the fifth estate, and CTV did the same for W5. Haig was editor on the Beryl Fox documentaries Fields of Endless Day, The Single Woman and the Double Standard, Summer in Mississippi and The Mills of the Gods: Viet Nam, which won Film of the Year at the 18th Canadian Film Awards in 1966.

In 1970, Haig co-founded the (now-defunct) Canadian Film Editors Guild. He was chairman of the Canadian Film and Television Association in 1972.

Among the films he helped produce was Artie Shaw: Time Is All You've Got, which was written and directed by Brigitte Berman in 1985. Oprah Winfrey presented Berman and Haig with an Oscar at the 59th Academy Awards.

After the 1992 sale of Film Arts to Film House, Haig joined the National Film Board of Canada and became head of English documentary production. He was noted for aiding young talent with funding, guidance, and editing. He retired in 1998.

Personal life
Haig died of cancer at his home in Toronto in 2002, at age  68. His life partner was Bill Schultz, who is now the Co-Chair of the Don Haig Foundation.

The Don Haig Foundation
In 2003, The Don Haig Foundation was established to support and recognize young filmmakers. In 2006, the foundation began a partnership with the Hot Docs Canadian International Documentary Festival to ensure a home for the Don Haig Award, a monetary award which is presented to a filmmaker with a feature-length entry at the festival. The Don Haig Award is presented annually to an outstanding Canadian independent producer, with the recipient selected by a jury of independent filmmakers. The award recognizes creative vision and entrepreneurship, as reflected in the recipient’s body of work, as well as a track record of mentoring emerging Canadian filmmakers. Winners of the award are Aubrey Nealon (2004), Ron Stefaniuk (2005), Guylaine Dionne (2006), Sean Garrity (Special Jury Prize 2006), Hubert Davis (2007), Yung Chang (2008), Brett Gaylor (2009), Tracey Deer (Special Jury Prize 2009), Philip Lyall and Nimisha Mukerji (2010), Rama Rau (2011), Mia Donovan (2012), Charles Officer (Jury Special Merit Award 2012), Merit Jensen Carr (2013), Michael McNamara (2014), Anne Pick (2015), Ed Barreveld (2016), Daniel Cross (2017), Ina Fichman (2018), Peter Raymont (2019), Bob Moore (2020), Lalita Krishna (2021), Mila Aung-Thwin (2022).

Filmography

Film Arts
The Single Woman and the Double Standard - documentary, Beryl Fox 1964 - editor
 Summer in Mississippi - documentary short, Beryl Fox 1965 - editor
The Mills of the Gods: Viet Nam - documentary, Beryl Fox 1965 - editor
A Path of His Own - Paul Caulfield 1970 - editor
 The National Dream: Building the Impossible Railway - James Murray, Eric Till 1974 - editor
125 Rooms of Comfort feature, Patrick Loubert 1974 - producer
Serpent River Paddlers - documentary short, Anthony Hall 1975 - producer 
Pleasure Island - short film, Dan Wright 1975 - producer
 Fields of Endless Day - Terence Macartney-Filgate 1978 - editor
Summer's Children - feature, Julius Kohanyi 1979 - co-producer
 Track Stars: The Unseen Heroes of Movie Sound - documentary short, Terry Burke 1979 - co-producer
Carillon: The Bells of Song - documentary short 1979 - producer
Portrait of Christine - documentary short 1979 - producer`
Different Timbres - documentary, Claire Prieto & Roger McTair 1980 - executive producer
A.J. Casson: The Only Critic is Time - documentary, Michael Morningstar 1981 - producer
Alligator Shoes - feature, Clay Boris 1981 - co-producer
A Helping Hand (The Nature of Things) - documentary short 1982 - co-producer
 K.C.I.: Beyond the Three R's - documentary short, Scott Barrie 1982 - editor
Alex Colville: The Splendour of Order - documentary, Don Hutchison 1984 - executive producer 
Concertante: Arnold Spohr and the Royal Winnipeg Ballet - documentary, Gabriel Markiw 1984 
Unfinished Business - feature, Don Owen 1984 - co-executive producer
 Finding Out: Incest and Family Sexual Abuse - documentary short, Susan Murgatroyd 1984 - co-producer 
Artie Shaw: Time Is All You've Got - documentary, Brigitte Berman, Bridge Film Productions 1985 - associate producer
D.P. Brown: Beyond Realism - documentary short, Athan Katsos 1985 - co-producer
Samuel Lount - feature, Laurence Keane 1985 - co-producer
Overnight - feature, Jack Darcus 1985 - co-producer
Dancing in the Dark - feature, Leon Marr 1986 - co-producer
Those Roos Boys and Friends - documentary, Barbara Boyden 1987 - co-writer, co-producer 
Home to Buxton - documentary short, Roger McTair & Claire Prieto 1987 - co-producer 
The Kidnapping of Baby John Doe - TV movie, Peter Gerretsen 1987 - executive producer
I've Heard the Mermaids Singing - feature, Patricia Rozema 1987 - executive producer
Dreams Beyond Memory - feature, Andrzej Markiewicz 1987 - executive producer
Night Friend - feature, Peter Gerretsen 1987 - executive producer
Deep Sea Conspiracy - feature, Michael Brun 1987 - co-producer
Growing Up in America - documentary, Morley Markson 1988 - co-producer
Comic Book Confidential - documentary, Ron Mann 1988 - co-producer
Dear John - feature, Catherine Ord 1988 - co-producer
Solitary Journey - documentary, Vic Sarin 1989 - co-producer
Stanley Knowles: By Word and Deed - documentary short, Dan Curtis 1988 - producer
Turnabout - feature, Don Owen 1988 - executive producer
The Brain - feature, Edward Hunt 1988 - co-producer
Shadow Dancing - feature, Lewis Furey 1988 - co-producer
The Crow and the Canary - documentary short, Arnie Lipsey 1989 - producer
Mob Story - feature, Gabriel Markiw & Jancarlo Markiw 1989 - co-producer
Odyssey in August - documentary short, Stephen Roscoe 1989 - producer
Termini Station - feature, Allan King 1989 - co-producer
Special of the Day - documentary short, Robert Kennedy 1989 - producer
The Midday Sun - feature, Lulu Keating 1989 - executive producer
Freakshow - feature, Constantino Magnatta 1989 - executive producer
St. Nicholas and the Children - feature, George Bloomfield 1989 - co-producer
Defy Gravity - feature, Michael Gibson 1990 - co-producer
In Advance of the Landing - documentary short, Dan Curtis 1990 - producer
Elizabeth Smart: On the Side of Angels - documentary, Maya Gallus 1991 - executive producer
Thick as Thieves - Steve DiMarco 1991 - co-producer
White Light - feature, Al Waxman 1991 - executive producer 
The Heart of a Viking: The Story of Joe Boyle - documentary short, Pat Patterson 1991 - producer
The Twist - documentary, Ron Mann 1992 - co-producer
Just For Fun - documentary short, David Oiye 1993 - producer

National Film Board of Canada

 A Further Glimpse of Joey - documentary short, Don Owen 1966 - editor
Timothy Findley: Anatomy of a Writer - documentary, Terence Macartney-Filgate 1992 - co-executive producer
Nurses: The Heart of the System documentary, Tanya Tree 1992 - co-executive producer
Secret Nation - feature, Michael Jones 1992 - executive producer
First Nations: The Circle Unbroken - documentary series, Geraldine Bob, Gary Marcuse, Deanna Nyce & Lorna Williams 1993 - co-executive producer
View from the Typewriter - documentary, Robert A. Duncan 1993 - co-executive producer
Freedom Had a Price - documentary, Yurij Luhovy 1994 - executive producer
Blockade - documentary, Nettie Wild 1994 - co-producer
By Woman’s Hand - documentary, Pepita Ferrari 1994 - co-executive producer
 Seven Crows a Secret - documentary short, John Forrest 1994 - co-executive producer
 When Shirley Met Florence - documentary short, Ronit Bezalel 1994 - executive producer
 Trawna Tuh Belvul - animated short, Martin Rose 1994 - co-executive producer
Dinosaurs: Piecing It All Together - documentary, Michael McKennirey 1994 - co-executive producer
Children for Hire - documentary, Lyn Wright 1994 - co-executive producer 
The Summer of ‘67 - documentary, Albert Kish & Donald Winkler 1994 - executive producer
Lessons - documentary, Paul Cowan 1995 - co-executive producer
 My Name is Kahentiiosta - documentary short, Alanis Obomsawin 1995 - executive producer
10-7 For Life - documentary, Cynthia Banks 1995 - co-executive producer 
Anatomy of Desire - documentary, Peter Tyler Boullata & Jean-François Monette 1995 - executive producer
Canada Remembers: Part 1, Turning the Tide - documentary, Terence Macartney-Filgate 1995 - executive producer
Canada Remembers: Part 2, The Liberators - documentary, Terence Macartney-Filgate 1995 - executive producer
Canada Remembers: Part 3, Endings and Beginnings - documentary, Terence Macartney-Filgate 1995 - executive producer
Baby Business - documentary, Judy Jackson 1995 - executive producer
 Multiple Choices - Blending - documentary short, Alison Burns 1995 - executive producer
 Multiple Choices - Choices - documentary short, Alison Burns 1995 - executive producer
 Multiple Choices - Community - documentary short, Alison Burns 1995 - executive producer
 Multiple Choices - Families - documentary short, Alison Burns 1995 - executive producer
 Multiple Choices - Forever After? - documentary short, Alison Burns 1995 - executive producer
 Multiple Choices - Loves Me, Loves Me Not - documentary short, Alison Burns 1995 - executive producer
 Multiple Choices - Picture Perfect - documentary short, Alison Burns 1995 - executive producer
 Multiple Choices - Power Lines - documentary short, Alison Burns 1995 - executive producer
 Multiple Choices - Searching - documentary short, Alison Burns 1995 - executive producer
 Multiple Choices - The Agony and the Ecstasy - documentary short, Alison Burns 1995 - executive producer
 Multiple Choices - Tying the Knot - documentary short, Alison Burns 1995 - executive producer
 Multiple Choices - Who, What, Where, When? - documentary short, Alison Burns 1995 - executive producer
 Multiple Choices - Who’s Who? - documentary short, Alison Burns 1995 - executive producer
The Odyssey Diaries - documentary, Susan Fleming 1995 - co-executive producer
The Reluctant Deckhand - short film, Jan Padgett 1995 - co-executive producer
 The Pinnacle and the Poet - documentary short, Louise Abbott 1995 - executive producer
Who's Counting? Marilyn Waring on Sex, Lies and Global Economics - documentary, Terre Nash 1995 - co-executive producer
Silence & Storm - documentary,  Jeremiah Hayes 1995 - co-executive producer
The Voyage of the St. Louis - documentary, Maziar Bahari 1995 - executive producer
A Web of War - documentary, Brian McKenna 1995 - co-executive producer
War at Sea: The Black Pit - documentary, Brian McKenna 1995 - executive producer
War at Sea: U-Boats in the St. Lawrence - documentary, Brian McKenna 1995 - executive producer
 Le temps d'une guerre - documentary, Jacques Vallée 1995 - co-executive producer
The Passerby - documentary, Donald McWilliams 1995 - co-executive producer
The Marco Polo: Queen of the Seas - documentary, Roger Hart 1995 - co-executive producer
Eldon Rathburn: They Shoot...He Scores - documentary short, Louis Hone 1995 - executive producer
 Mystery of the Maya - documentary short, Barrie Howells & Roberto Rochin 1995 - co-executive producer
Broken Promises: The High Arctic Relocation - documentary, Patricia Tassinari, Ziad Hamzeh 1995 - executive producer
Children First! - documentary, Jacques Vallée 1995 - executive producer
 Children of Jerusalem - Gesho - documentary short, Beverly Shaffer 1996 - executive producer
 Children of Jerusalem - Ibrahim - documentary short, Beverly Shaffer 1996 - executive producer
 Children of Jerusalem - Yehuda - documentary short, Beverly Shaffer 1996 - executive producer
Fennario: His World on Stage - documentary short, Alec MacLeod 1996 - executive producer
 Marilyn Waring on Politics, Local & Global - documentary short, Terre Nash 1996 - co-executive producer
 Marilyn Waring on The Environment - documentary short, Terre Nash 1996 - co-executive producer
 Marilyn Waring on Women and Economics - documentary short, Terre Nash 1996 - co-executive producer
 Faces of the Hand - documentary short, Tamás Wormser 1996 - executive producer
A Balkan Journey: Fragments from the Other Side of the War - documentary, Brenda Longfellow 1996 - co-executive producer 
 Bronwen & Yaffa: Moving Towards Tolerance - documentary short, Peter d'Entremont 1996 - co-executive producer
Chronicle of a Genocide Foretold: Part 1, Blood was Flowing Like a River - documentary, Danièle Lacourse & Yvan Patry 1996 - co-executive producer
Chronicle of a Genocide Foretold: Part 2, We Were Cowards - documentary, Danièle Lacourse & Yvan Patry 1996 - co-executive producer
Chronicle of a Genocide Foretold: Part 3, We Feel Betrayed - documentary, Danièle Lacourse & Yvan Patry 1996 - co-executive producer
First Nation Blue - documentary, Daniel Prouty 1996 - executive producer
Good Things Too - short film, Liz Scully 1996 - co-executive producer
Packing Heat - documentary, Wendy Rowland 1996 - executive producer
Tough Assignment - documentary, John Walker 1996 - executive producer
The Power Game - documentary, Anne Henderson 1996 - co-producer and -executive producer
 Power - documentary, Magnus Isacsson 1996 - executive producer
Sitting on a Volcano - documentary, Danièle Lacourse 1996 - co-executive producer
 Someone to Talk to: Peer-Helping in High School - documentary short, Annie Ilkow 1996 - executive producer
 The Spell of the Yukon - documentary, Rita Roy 1996 - executive producer
Wanted! Doctor on Horseback - documentary, Claire Helman 1996 - executive producer
You Won't Need Running Shoes, Darling - documentary, Dorothy Todd Hénaut 1996 - executive producer
Murder Remembered: Norfolk County 1950 - documentary, Robert Fortier 1997 - executive producer
The Need to Know - documentary, Tom Puchniak 1997 - co-producer and -executive producer
The Petticoat Expeditions: Part One, Anna Jameson - documentary short, Pepita Ferrari 1997 - executive producer
The Petticoat Expeditions: Part Two, The Countess of Aberdeen - documentary short, Pepita Ferrari 1997 - executive producer
The Petticoat Expeditions: Part Three, Frances Hopkins - documentary short, Pepita Ferrari 1997 - executive producer
The Gender Tango - documentary, Léa Pool 1997 co-producer and -executive producer
All the Right Stuff - documentary short, Connie Littlefield 1997 - co-executive producer 
Barbed Wire and Mandolins - documentary, Nicola Zavaglia 1997 - executive producer
Caregivers: Episode One: Madeleine and Rose - documentary, Dan Curtis 1997 - executive producer
Caregivers: Episode Two: Doris and Tom - documentary, Dan Curtis 1997 - executive producer
Caregivers: Episode Three: Kurt and Elizabeth - documentary, Dan Curtis 1997 - executive producer
Caregivers: Episode Four: Pat and Molly - documentary, Dan Curtis 1997 - executive producer
Caregivers: Episode Five: Paul and Jean - documentary, Dan Curtis 1997 - executive producer
Circles - documentary, Shanti Thakur 1997 - executive producer
The Battle of Vimy Ridge, Part 1: Setting the Stage - documentary short, John Bradshaw 1997 - co-producer and -executive producer
The Battle of Vimy Ridge, Part 2: Keys to Victory - documentary short, John Bradshaw 1997 - co-producer and -executive producer
The Battle of Vimy Ridge, Part 3: The Battle Looms - documentary short, John Bradshaw 1997 - co-producer and -executive producer
Body Politics - documentary, Anne Henderson 1997 - co-producer, co-executive producer
Creatures of the Sun - documentary short, Susan Trow 1997 - co-executive producer
Alternate Route - documentary, Denise Withers 1997 - co-executive producer
Spudwrench - documentary, Alanis Obomsawin 1997 - executive producer
The Street: A Film with the Homeless - documentary, Daniel Cross 1997 - co-producer
Jeunes, beaux et entreprenants - documentary, Liette Aubin, Denise Withers 1997 - co-executive producer
 A Place in the World - documentary, Robert Lang 1997 - co-producer
Seven Brides for Uncle Sam - documentary, Anita Reilly McGee 1997 - co-executive producer
Postcards from the Future - documentary, Joshua Chaplinsky, Kevin Kölsch, Dennis Widmyer 1997 - co-producer
Victor-Martin, Diane and John - documentary, Steven Kellar 1997 - executive producer
An Untidy Package - documentary, Debbie McGee 1997 - co-executive producer
The Double Shift - documentary, Tom Puchniak 1997 - co-executive producer
Kid Nerd - documentary, Shereen Jerrett 1997 - co-executive producer
Louisbourg Under Siege - documentary, Albert Kish 1997 - executive producer
David Fennario’s Banana Boots - documentary, Alec MacLeod 1998 - co-executive producer
Desperately Seeking Helen - documentary, Eisha Marjara 1998 - co-executive producer
Democracy à la Maude - documentary, Patricia Kearns 1998 - co-executive producer
Labour of Love - documentary, Dan Curtis 1998 - co-executive producer
Shylock - documentary, Pierre Lasry 1998 - executive producer
The Illuminated Life of Maud Lewis - documentary, Peter d'Entremont 1998 - co-executive producer
Asylum - documentary, Garry Beitel 1998 - co-executive producer
The Kitchen Goddess - documentary, Donna Davies 1999 - co-executive producer
Picturing a People: George Johnston, Tlingit Photographer - documentary, Carol Geddes 1999 - co-executive producer
Under One Sky: Arab Women in North America Talk About the Hijab - documentary, Jennifer Kawaja 1999 - co-executive producer
And So to Bed - documentary, Jeffrey McKay 1999 - co-executive producer
Beyond Borders: Arab Feminists Talk About Their Lives...East and West - documentary, Jennifer Kawaja 1999 - co-executive producer
Moving Pictures - documentary, Colin Low 2000 - co-executive producer
Postcards from Canada - documentary, Tony Ianzelo, 2000 - co-executive producer
Aftermath: The Remnants of War - documentary, Daniel Sekulich 2001 - co-executive producer

Lifetime awards
 6th Genie Awards, Toronto: Air Canada Award for Outstanding Contributions to the Canadian Film Industry, 1985
 Ontario Film Institute’s Achievement Award, 1987
 City of Toronto Arts Award, 1991
 Governor General's Performing Arts Award, 1993
 In 1993, Haig received an honorary doctorate (D.Litt.) from York University.

References

External links 
 National Film Board of Canada film collection
 Canadian Film Encyclopedia
 Don Haig Award at Hot Docs
 The Don Haig Foundation

1933 births
2002 deaths
Canadian documentary film directors
Canadian documentary film producers
Canadian television producers
Canadian film editors
Governor General's Performing Arts Award winners
Canadian gay men
LGBT film producers
LGBT television producers
Canadian Broadcasting Corporation people
National Film Board of Canada people
Film directors from Winnipeg
Film directors from Toronto
20th-century Canadian LGBT people
Film producers from Manitoba